Germanic boar helmets are attested in archaeological finds from England and Sweden, dating to Vendel and Anglo-Saxon periods, and Old English and Old Norse written sources. They consist of helmets decorated with either a boar crest or other boar imagery that was believed to offer protection in battle to the wearer. They have also been proposed to be a costume for the ritual transformation into a boar, similar to berserkers, and to be associated with Freyr.

Context

Roman, Celtic and Baltic

The boar was an important symbol in prehistoric Europe, where, according to the archaeologist Jennifer Foster, it was "venerated, eulogised, hunted and eaten ... for millennia, until its virtual extinction in recent historical time." Anglo-Saxon and Vendel era boar symbols are preceded by a thousand years of similar iconography, coming after La Tène examples in the fourth century BC, Gaulish specimens three centuries later, and Roman boars in the fourth century AD. The boar is said to have been sacred to a mother goddess figure among linguistically Celtic communities in Iron Age Europe, while the Roman historian Tacitus, writing around the first century AD, suggested that the Baltic Aesti wore boar symbols in battle to invoke her protection. Four legions, including the twentieth that was stationed in Britain, also adopted the boar as their emblem. The sole unequivocal depictions of boar-crested helmets outside of Germanic sources are on interior plate E of the Gundestrup cauldron, dating to the La Tène period or early Roman Iron Age, which is commonly believed to be Celtic in origin but also has elements suggesting Thracian origin.

Germanic
Boars had a prominent role for the Germanic peoples and were closely associated with battle. The boar's snout formation was a wedge formation first attested in the 4th century AD, used by the Germanic peoples and named due to its appearance. The formation was also used in the medieval period, as attested in sources such as Knýtlinga saga and Ólafs saga Tryggvasonar. In Gesta Danorum, Book VII, the formation is taught by Odin to Harald Wartooth, who was named due to the tusks he grew to replace two of his teeth that fell out while he was young.

In mythological sources, the boar Saehrimnir is killed each day to feed the einherjar, while Gullinbursti and Hildisvíni are owned by the gods Freyr and Freyja respectively. In a ritual context, swine are often sacrificed and eaten during blóts (in particular the sonarblót), and are central in some forms of heitstrenging, where the boar is described as being holy. Guldgubbar finds include figures of swine and their ritual deposition has been linked with Vanir worship.

Boar symbolism and religious practice is closely associated with Sweden, a cultic centre for Freyr, and where it has been suggested to have been a totemic animal. Both the Swedish Yngling royal family and families of Icelandic settlers that can be traced back to Sweden are described as specifically worshiping Freyr and owning boars. In later sources,  the meaning of 'boar' and has been predominantly replaced by 'ruler' or 'prince'. This transition has been proposed due to the association between boar helmets and nobility. 

Despite the numerous associations between boars and the Vanir, Freyr and Freyja, it is to be noted that the boar also has symbolism in its own right and is not always linked with the gods.

Archeological record

Helmets and fragments
Both boar-crested helmets and crest fragments dating to the Anglo-Saxon period have been discovered in England such as the Benty Grange helmet found in Derbyshire, dating to the 7th century AD. Boars also feature on the eyebrow terminals of the Sutton Hoo Helmet which shares features both with other Anglo-Saxon and Vendel era helmets, and has been suggested to have been made in Sweden. It has been proposed that a post-Roman introduction of a Germanic tradition from the European mainland, rather than the continuation of a tradition in Britain through 400 years of Roman rule, resulted in the return to prominence in the Anglo-Saxon period.

The Benty Grange boar has been suggested to have originally been fitted with boar bristles which would form an accentuated dorsal crest, a motif that has been suggested to point towards the animal's aggression and ferocity, consistent with martial associations. It has also been proposed that the golden decoration of the boar represents Freyr's boar Gullinbursti who has golden bristles, however there is no direct evidence that this story was known in England at the time of construction.

Images
Unlike those found in England, no Scandinavian helmets have yet been discovered with boar crests, however plates depicting them have been found in Sweden, dating to the Vendel era. The Vendel I helmet, dated to approximately 650 AD has plates showing a rider accompanied by a bird of prey with a boar-crested helmet. Similarly, the Valsgärde 7 helmet has a plate depicting two warriors carrying spears and wearing boar-crested helmets, a motif that bears a strong resemblance to one of the 6th century Torslunda plates. It has been suggested that the helmets depicted on these plates are of an older style than the helmets that the plates are decorating.

Literary attestations

Old English

Beowulf
Boar helmets are referenced in the Anglo-Saxon poem Beowulf five times. In three cases they appear to feature freestanding boars atop the helmets, like the Guilden Morden example. Such is the case when Grendel's mother seeks vengeance for the death of her son.

In another case, Hrothgar laments the death of his advisor by Grendel's mother:

In two instances, boars are referred to in the plural, such as when Beowulf and his men leave their ship as "[b]oar-shapes flashed above their cheek-guards" These references may refer instead boars like those on the eyebrows of the Sutton Hoo helmet, as opposed to crests.

Elene
In the poem Elene, the word  appears twice and has been translated as "boar-crest on a helmet" or "boar-banner". In this context, it is presented both as a symbol of protection, and as a heathen symbol that is contrasted with the Christian cross.

Old Norse

In Old Norse sources, helmets may be associated with boars, in particular those of the Yngling royal house. The Swedish king Aðils owned the helmets Hildisvín ('Battle-swine') and Hildigǫltr ('Battle-boar'), the former of which was inherited from another Yngling, his parental uncle Áli.  is also listed as a heiti for a helmet in Nafnaþulur, and is attested in the skaldic poetry of Háttatal:

The heiti  is also used in Hrafnsmál as part of a battle kenning:

It has been further proposed that the helmet heiti  and  refer to swine through the component , a heiti for swine attested in Nafnaþulur also found as a suffix in the name Sæhrímnir.

Function of imagery
Boar imagery on Anglo-Saxon helmets is associated explicitly with protection in Beowulf where the poet describes the figures on helmets kept watch over the warriors wearing them. It has been proposed that the figures have an apotropaic role and that cutting them off will result in the death of the warrior. In the latter case, the boar and warrior appear to be regarded as a singular entity with a shared life.

Consistent with this is a helmet plate from Vendel grave XIV in Uppland that depicts two warriors with bird-crest helmets, one of which also has boar tusks, suggesting it is the armour that makes them a representation of the animal. People in medieval Germanic literature can be referred to as boars such as Ragnar Lodbrok in his eponymous saga. In the case of Kjalnesinga saga, a warrior is specifically described as having boar-like teeth when fighting. While  and berserkers are frequently in service to kings, they are commonly portrayed negatively, instead of as noble heroes, and lacking control over their actions. On the other hand, identification or comparison with a wild boar is positive and closely associated with the warrior elite. The distinction has been suggested to result from bears and wolves being predatory, while boars, though fierce and often fighting to the death when cornered, forage rather than hunt.

Notes

See also 
 Boar's tusk helmet

Citations

Bibliography

Primary

Secondary
 
  
  
 
 
  
 
 
 
 
  
 
 

 
 
 
 
  

7th-century artifacts
Anglo-Saxon archaeology
Beowulf
Medieval helmets
Medieval European metalwork objects
Swedish art
Pigs in art